How to Lie with Statistics is a book written by Darrell Huff in 1954 presenting an introduction to statistics for the general reader. Not a statistician, Huff was a journalist who wrote many "how to" articles as a freelancer.

The book is a brief, breezy illustrated volume outlining the misuse of statistics and errors in the interpretation of statistics, and how errors create incorrect conclusions.

In the 1960s and 1970s, it became a standard textbook introduction to the subject of statistics for many college students.  It has become one of the best-selling statistics books in history, with over one and a half million copies sold in the English-language edition. It has also been widely translated.

Themes of the book include "Correlation does not imply causation" and "Using random sampling". It also shows how statistical graphs can be used to distort reality, for example by truncating the bottom of a line or bar chart, so that differences seem larger than they are, or by representing one-dimensional quantities on a pictogram by two- or three-dimensional objects to compare their sizes, so that the reader forgets that the images do not scale the same way the quantities do.

The original edition contained illustrations by artist Irving Geis. In a UK edition, Geis' illustrations were replaced by cartoons by Mel Calman.

See also
Lies, damned lies, and statistics

Notes

References
 Darrell Huff, (1954) How to Lie with Statistics (illust. I. Geis), Norton, New York,

External links

1954 non-fiction books
Statistics books
Misuse of statistics